Ashour El Adham (born 11 June 1985), is an Egyptian footballer who plays for Ceramica Cleopatra FC as a defensive midfielder. El Adham is known for his powerful shots and for his ability to score goals from long ranges.

Career
In June 2010, El Adham penned a four-year contract to join Zamalek from Al Masry as part of a swap deal. Al Masry signed Ahmed Magdy and Ahmed El Merghany in exchange.

References

External links
 

1985 births
Living people
People from Port Said
Egyptian footballers
Association football midfielders
Egypt international footballers
Egyptian Premier League players
Egyptian expatriate footballers
Expatriate footballers in Sudan
Al Masry SC players
Zamalek SC players
El Gouna FC players
Al Ittihad Alexandria Club players
Al-Merrikh SC players
Haras El Hodoud SC players